Events from the year 1438 in France

Incumbents
 Monarch – Charles VII

Events
 7 July – Charles VII issues the Pragmatic Sanction of Bourges

Births
 5 February – Margaret of Bourbon, noblewoman (died 1483)

References

1430s in France